The red-lined blind snake (Epictia rubrolineata) is a species of snake in the family Leptotyphlopidae.

References

Epictia
Reptiles described in 1901